Thomas John McMahon FRGS (1864 – 1933) was an Australian photojournalist and author. From 1915 to 1922 he made several trips to Melanesia and Micronesia.

His photographic reports depicting the Pacific Islanders gained  a widespread audience. Thousands were published worldwide in newspapers, magazines, books, serial encyclopedias and postcards. McMahon contributed to create a popular and visual knowledge of the Pacific. His work answered a demand in Australia, and the Western World, for visual information on the life in the Pacific Islands, the local's physical appearance and customs and whether economic opportunities existed for settlers or investors.

Biography 

Thomas McMahon, born in 1864, made a first trip to New Guinea in 1915, he then toured the Pacific till 1922 in order to advocate Australian colonialism, tourism and economic development in the area.  He journeyed Nauru, Banaba, the Gilbert islands, the Marshall islands, the Solomon Islands, the New Hebrides,  Fiji and the Torres strait Islands.

After a reporting on Fiji published in The Sydney Mail in late 1921 and early 1922, he traveled to Asia in August 1922. He published a book about the experience and became a rural reporter and photographer for Brisbane's Courier Mail. He died in 1933.

Works

References

Bibliography 

 
 

Australian photojournalists
Fellows of the Royal Geographical Society
1864 births
1933 deaths